Charles Macaulay was an American actor and director.

Early life
He was born and raised in Kentucky.

Education and career
He was trained at the Royal Academy of Dramatic Art in London and on graduating won the First Judges Medal with notes of congratulation from John Gielgud and John Mills for his performance in The Heiress.

In 1952 he made his first appearance in New York in The Sacred Flame by W. Somerset Maugham.

He worked on the east coast for a number of years, appearing in six off-Broadway productions as well as seven Broadway productions as well as Barter Theatre opposite Judith Anderson. He also appeared in live TV shows such as Armstrong Circle Theatre and Studio One.

On stage, he appeared in Man and Superman, The Winslow Boy, Bell, Book and Candle and The Dark Is Light Enough.

He also acted in Shakespeare's plays and played Benedick in Much Ado About Nothing and the title role in Macbeth at the Old Globe Theatre in San Diego.

Perry Mason
He was part of the Perry Mason TV film series, initially playing a judge, then District Attorney Markham. He was a friend of  Raymond Burr and was an administrator of his estate.

Other TV roles
He appeared in the original run of Star Trek, Mission: Impossible, Gunsmoke, Baa Baa Black Sheep and Columbo.

Academia
He taught at the USC School of Theatre from 1986 to 1992, directing six student productions.

Death
He died of cancer in Sonoma County at the age of 72 in 1999.

References

People from Kentucky
American actors
American directors
1999 deaths
Deaths from cancer